The Reporter may refer to:

Periodicals

United States 
 The Reporter (Vacaville), a newspaper in Vacaville, California
 The Reporter (magazine), American magazine published from 1949 to 1968
 The Reporter (Fond du Lac, Wisconsin), a newspaper in Fond du Lac, Wisconsin
 The Reporter (Lansdale), a newspaper in Lansdale, Pennsylvania
 The Reporter (newspaper), a weekly community newspaper based in the Chicago suburb of Palos Heights
 The Reporter (US Air Force), a publication of the United States Air Force Judge Advocate General's Corps
 The Armenian Reporter, an independent weekly published in English in the United States since 1967
 The APF Reporter, a magazine published by the Alicia Patterson Foundation.
 The Beach Reporter, a weekly newspaper serving the Beach Cities of Los Angeles's South Bay
 The Chicago Reporter, a monthly periodical based in Chicago focusing on poverty and race issues
 The Daily Reporter (Coldwater), a newspaper in Coldwater, Michigan
 The Daily Reporter (Columbus), a newspaper in Columbus, Ohio
 Daily Reporter (Greenfield), a newspaper in Greenfield, Indiana
 The Daily Reporter (Milwaukee, Wisconsin)
 The Daily Reporter (Spencer), a newspaper in Spencer, Iowa
 The Hollywood Reporter, an entertainment newspaper
 The Hudson Reporter, a chain of newspapers serving Hudson County, New Jersey
 The Lebanon Reporter, a daily newspaper serving Lebanon, Indiana and adjacent portions of Boone County, Indiana
 The News Reporter, a broadsheet semi-weekly (Monday and Thursday) newspaper based in Whiteville, North Carolina

Ethiopia 
 Ethiopian Reporter, an English and Amharic-language newspaper in Ethiopia owned by MCC (Media Communication Center)

Belize 
 The Reporter (Belize), one of the chief newspapers of Belize

Northern Ireland 
 The Impartial Reporter, a newspaper based in Enniskillen, County Fermanagh, Northern Ireland

Taiwan 
 The Reporter (Taiwan), an investigative digital media outlet in Taiwan

Other uses 
 The Reporter (film), a 2012 Malayalam thriller film
 The Reporter (TV series), a 1964 American television series that aired for 13 weeks on CBS
 The Reporters (1988 TV program), a 1988–90 American newsmagazine television program that aired on FOX
 "The Reporter" (Parks and Recreation), an episode of the American comedy television series Parks and Recreation
 The Reporter (play), a Nicholas Wright play about journalist David James Mossman
 Reporter TV, an Indian television news channel in Malayalam

See also 
 Reporter (disambiguation)
 El Reportero (disambiguation)
The Reporters (disambiguation)